Iolair (Gaelic for eagle) is a specialised semi-submersible offshore platform designed for BP to support and service oil platforms in the North Sea and served as an emergency support vessel (ESV) in the Forties Oil Field. Since 2000 it has been working in the Cantarell Field, Mexico as an offshore construction and maintenance service vessel operated by Cotemar S.A de C.V.

Particulars
Iolair is a self-propelled, twin hull, vessel and  operates as a dynamically positioned (DP) construction support vessel.

This unique vessel did not start as an ESV, but rather as the concept of a maintenance and support vessel (MSV). It was proposed for the Forties oil field, jointly owned by British National Oil Corporation and operated by BP Petroleum Development Company Ltd in the North Sea. A particular feature of the design by the Naval Architects was that there was no cross-bracing between the pontoons. Instead, the platform was given extra strength by a box-girder construction and diagonal bracing was arranged from the centre of the platform to the pontoons. This arrangement remained virtually unchanged to the build completion and offered exceptional speed when the vessel was de-ballasted on the surface. The intention was to achieve a rapid response to emergencies, wherever they might be experienced in the North Sea.

As an MSV, the vessel was always conceived to provide accommodation for about 220 persons, saturation diving facilities, a large workshop, craneage, and helicopter landing area with hangar and re-fueling. All were still featured in the eventual design but had been enhanced with other features and sophistication much of which was to support the emergency role. ESV incorporated novelty and ideas that were years ahead of their time. Indeed, part of the brief was that she should still be modern ten years after entering service.

The saturation diving system was equipped with an advanced launch and recovery system.

History

Designed by Victor Griffin Carrell and Eric Tim's for BP. 
She was built by Scott Lithgow in Port Glasgow, and launched on 6 April 1981. In her early years, she was based in the BP Forties Oil Field.

In 1995, she was sold to U.S. drilling company Reading & Bates. She was to be converted to a workover/well intervention vessel and was stationed West of Shetland. The modifications included removal of some of the top structures, removal of the fire-fighting systems, closing of the dive tube and wave surge tank. However the intended conversion was never carried out and she was heavily involved in the installation of subsea production equipment using Remote Operated Vehicles. She was also heavily involved in the commissioning of the Foinaven and Schiehallion floating production vessels.

In 2000 she left the UK oilfields and went to the Bay of Campeche, Mexico, working in the Cantarell Field. There she carries out construction and platform support work. She was sold in 2001 by Transocean, who had taken over Reading and Bates, then sold to Exeter Marine Ltd. and since 2017 is  owned by Iolair Offshore Pte Ltd. and registered in the Marshall Islands, a long way from her original registered port of Dundee in Scotland.

Industry firsts
 Heave/swell compensation in the diving tube to enable operation in rougher weather.
 A Citadel area to which people could retire and survive if the vessel was engulfed in gas.
 A drenching system to cool exterior surfaces if the vessel was close to a burning platform.   
 The largest capacity and longest range firefighting monitors ever at sea.
 Fixed water-cannon on the after columns to cool the underside of production platforms.

Iolair is assured of its place in history by being the subject of a 28p commemorative stamp issued by Post Office Ltd. on 25 May 1983. This was one of a series of three stamps celebrating British Engineering Achievements.

References

1982 ships
Oil platforms
Semi-submersibles
Ships built on the River Clyde
Transocean
Ships of BP